WKZE-FM (98.1 FM, "KZE 98.1") is a radio station licensed to  Salisbury, Connecticut.  The station broadcasts to the upper Hudson Valley Region, northern Harlem Valley and north western Connecticut. It is independently owned by Willpower Radio, LLC and airs an Album Adult Alternative music format.  The broadcast studios are located 7564 North Broadway (U.S. Route 9), Red Hook, New York.

History
In January 1986, the FCC added 98.1 MHz to the table of allotments for Salisbury, Connecticut.  Johnson Development Corporation, then owner of WKZE applied for and was granted a construction permit in March 1988.  The allotment was assigned the WKZE-FM call letters by the Federal Communications Commission on March 10, 1988. From that point, the construction permit was extended five times until the station was licensed in 1993.

In September 1993, the station was transferred to Willpower Radio, LLC so named for majority shareholder William J. Stanley.  In early 2006, Willpower moved the station studios from Sharon, Connecticut, to Red Hook, New York, where they remain today. In July 2009, Willpower, LLC acquired the translator W256BI.

Programming
WKZE plays a selection of music from Folk, World, Blues, Rock, and Jazz genres often mixing unlikely songs together to form an eclectic sound unique to the station.  They also produce live music broadcasts called "Parlor Sessions" from national and local artists. The station plays artists such as The Jayhawks, Andrew Bird, Dar Williams, Drive-By Truckers, Sharon Jones, The Decemberists, The Beatles, Chris Stapleton, Wilco, Vieux Farka Toure, My Morning Jacket, Guy Davis, Waterboys, Natalie Merchant, Miles Davis, Tom Waits and others.

Advertising
WKZE only advertises locally owned, independent businesses.

References

External links
WKZE-FM official website

KZE-FM
Adult album alternative radio stations in the United States
Radio stations established in 1993
1993 establishments in Connecticut